Henri Burda (4 January 1926 – 29 October 1965) was a French-Polish former association football player and manager. He played in France for FC Metz and Limoges FC, and later coached Chamois Niortais and LB Châteauroux.

Managerial statistics

References

External links
 Henri Burda profile at chamoisfc79.fr

1965 deaths
1926 births
Polish footballers
Polish football managers
French footballers
French football managers
Polish emigrants to France
Association football defenders
FC Metz players
Limoges FC players
Chamois Niortais F.C. managers
LB Châteauroux managers
People from Włocławek County
Sportspeople from Kuyavian-Pomeranian Voivodeship